Serbia does not recognize any form of legal recognition for same-sex couples. Same-sex marriage is constitutionally banned under the Constitution of Serbia adopted in 2006. There have been discussions in the National Assembly to legalize civil unions.

Civil unions

In January 2011, the Ministry of Foreign Affairs gave permission to the British embassy in Belgrade to conduct civil partnership ceremonies between two British citizens or a British citizen and a non-Serbian national. The French embassy in Belgrade also offers civil solidarity pacts to French citizens and their foreign partners.

Attempts to pass civil union legislation
In May 2013, it was announced that a draft law on same-sex civil partnerships would be introduced to the National Assembly on 4 June. The law would allow hospital visitation and inheritance rights for same-sex partners, although it was not known whether this would be in the form of unregistered cohabitation or registered partnerships. The draft bill stalled and was never voted on.

In June 2019, plans were announced to amend the Civil Code to allow domestic partnerships between same-sex couples, providing some of the legal rights of marriage, including property rights and alimony. However, partners would not have been able to inherit, adopt or access fertility treatments. In July 2019, a lesbian couple from Novi Sad, Jelena Dubovi and Sunčica Kopunović, launched a legal challenge to establish legal recognition for same-sex couples.

In November 2020, the Minister for Human and Minority Rights and Social Dialogue, Gordana Čomić, announced that a law on same-sex partnerships would be brought before Parliament in the first half of 2021. The draft law was presented for public consultation in February 2021. In May 2021, President Aleksandar Vučić said he would veto the bill if it were approved by the National Assembly: "I don't know what the Assembly is planning when it comes to the law on same-sex unions. But, as the President of Serbia, I am obliged to protect the Constitution and I cannot sign that law." Čomić responded that the bill does not regulate the institution of marriage nor adoption of children by same-sex couples, but other issues such as hospital visitations and inheritance. Marko Mihailović, the director of Belgrade Pride, said, "We think that it is quite strange that the President of Serbia, who also holds a law degree, raises the issue of the unconstitutionality of the law, which is absolutely not true. This law cannot be unconstitutional because this is not a law on same-sex marriage." Serbia is obliged under the European Court of Human Rights' ruling in Oliari and Others v. Italy to provide legal recognition to same-sex couples. Čomić announced in January 2022 that a final version of the bill had been completed, but any progress on the bill was delayed due to the April 2022 elections and lack of political will. Tristan Flesenkemper, the head of the office of the Council of Europe in Belgrade, said that the law would "chang[e] the lives of people in Serbia for the better" and responded to the delay by stating, "To make a real change, it's necessary to have a strong political will and dedication, that will turn it into strong legislature that won't be just passed, but implemented too." If passed, the legislation would establish civil partnerships providing some of the legal rights, benefits and responsibilities of marriage.

Same-sex marriage
Article 62 of the Constitution of Serbia, adopted in 2006 after the dissolution of Serbia and Montenegro, states: "Marriage shall be entered into based on the free consent of man and woman before the state body." The wording has been interpreted as banning same-sex marriage.

In November 2015, former President Boris Tadić expressed his support for same-sex marriage and adoption by same-sex couples.

Public opinion
A 2020 opinion poll published by the Civil Rights Defenders showed that 73% of Serbians supported hospital visitation rights for same-sex couples, 60% supported health insurance for same-sex partners, 59% supported allowing same-sex partners to inherit each other's assets at death, and 59% supported equal division of property. In total, 80% of Serbians supported granting same-sex couples some legal rights. 26% of respondents supported same-sex marriage, an increase from 11% in 2015.

See also 
 LGBT rights in Serbia
 Recognition of same-sex unions in Europe

Notes

References 

Law of Serbia
LGBT rights in Serbia
Serbia